Ahaq (also known as Āfī) is a village in Sarajuy-ye Gharbi Rural District, in the Central District of Maragheh County, East Azerbaijan Province, Iran. At the 2006 census, its population was 1,171, in 341 families.

References 

Tageo

External links 

Towns and villages in Maragheh County